Aeroman may refer to:

An airline maintenance company, the El Salvadoran subsidiary of Aveos
A nickname for Mike Segura
A character found in the novel The Fortress of Solitude (novel)
Spanish airline Aeródromo De La Mancha (callsign AEROMAN)
AER Oman; see List of energy regulatory bodies

See also
 Airman (disambiguation)
 Aviator (disambiguation)